Goran Popov (born 2 October 1984) is a retired Macedonian footballer, who played as a defender.

Popov started his career with local side Belasica and moved to Greece with Proodeftiki and AEK Athens. He signed for Red Star Belgrade in 2004 but injuries prevented him from making an impact and he returned to Greek football with Egaleo after a short loan spell in Poland with Odra Wodzisław. Egaleo were relegated in 2007 and Popov joined Levadiakos before moving to Dutch club Heerenveen in July 2008. At Heerenveen he finally found some success and won the KNVB Cup in 2009 scoring in the final against FC Twente. After good form in European competitions Popov signed for Ukrainian side Dynamo Kyiv.

Life and career
Popov was born in Strumica, Socialist Republic of Macedonia, SFR Yugoslavia and played football with local club Belasica making six appearances as the side finished second in the First Macedonian Football League. He moved on to Greek side Proodeftiki and then AEK Athens. His time at Athens was short and after eight matches he left for Red Star Belgrade where he made his debut away at PSV Eindhoven in the UEFA Champions League as Red Star lost 5–0. Injuries prevented him from making at impact with Red Star and he joined Polish side Odra Wodzisław on loan. At the end of the 2004–05 season Popov returned to Greek football with Egaleo spending two seasons there and then one season with Levadiakos. In 2008, he made the move to Dutch football with Heerenveen where he won the KNVB Cup in 2009 and impressed enough in European football to earn a move to Ukrainian giants Dynamo Kyiv in June 2010.

On 10 August 2012, Popov initially signed for English Premier League side Stoke City on a season long loan deal, but the move fell through after he failed to be granted a UK work permit. On deadline day, Popov received a UK work permit and he signed instead on a season-long loan for West Bromwich Albion. After Artim Šakiri, Goran Popov is the second Macedonian football player who has ever played at West Bromwich Albion.

On 3 February 2013, Popov was dismissed by referee Mark Clattenberg for allegedly spitting at fullback Kyle Walker, in a game that ended 1–0 to Tottenham Hotspur.

On 9 July 2013, Popov signed a one-year loan deal to return to West Bromwich Albion.

On 18 September, Popov signed a three-year contract with Vardar for undisclosed fee. At the end of the 2018–19 season, Popov's contract with Vardar expired and he retired from football.

International career
Goran Popov has been part of the Macedonian U-19 and U-21 teams before making his debut senior for the Macedonian national team in June 2004 in a friendly match against Estonia. He has earned a total of 46 caps, scoring 2 goals and his final international was a May 2014 friendly against Cameroon.

International goals

Career statistics

Club
Statistics accurate as of match played 4 January 2014

A.  The "Other" column constitutes appearances and goals in the Johan Cruijff-schaal XIV and Ukrainian Super Cup.

International
As of August 2012

Personal life
He is the younger brother of Robert Popov who is also a football player.

References

External links
 
 
 Profile at MacedonianFootball 

1984 births
Living people
Sportspeople from Strumica
Association football fullbacks
Macedonian footballers
North Macedonia youth international footballers
North Macedonia under-21 international footballers
North Macedonia international footballers
FK Belasica players
Proodeftiki F.C. players
AEK Athens F.C. players
Red Star Belgrade footballers
Odra Wodzisław Śląski players
Egaleo F.C. players
Levadiakos F.C. players
SC Heerenveen players
FC Dynamo Kyiv players
West Bromwich Albion F.C. players
FK Vardar players
Doxa Katokopias FC players
Macedonian First Football League players
Super League Greece players
Ekstraklasa players
Eredivisie players
Ukrainian Premier League players
Premier League players
Macedonian expatriate footballers
Expatriate footballers in Greece
Expatriate footballers in Poland
Expatriate footballers in the Netherlands
Expatriate footballers in Ukraine
Expatriate footballers in England
Macedonian expatriate sportspeople in Greece
Macedonian expatriate sportspeople in Poland
Macedonian expatriate sportspeople in the Netherlands
Macedonian expatriate sportspeople in Ukraine
Macedonian expatriate sportspeople in England